The 1914 Mercer Baptists football team was an American football team that represented Mercer University as a member of the Southern Intercollegiate Athletic Association (SIAA) during the 1914 college football season. In their first year under head coach Fred A. Robins, the team compiled an 5–4 record.

Schedule

References

Mercer
Mercer Bears football seasons
Mercer Baptists football